Cariñena is a village in the province of Zaragoza, in the autonomous community of Aragon, Spain. It is the capital of the comarca Campo de Cariñena. It is known for its wine and the Cariñena grape, to which it gave its name. In ancient Roman times it was known as Carae and it was recorded that in the 3rd century BC its inhabitants drank wine mixed with honey.

History
The name Cariñena dates back to the Roman era. Pliny the Elder, the procurator of Tarraconensis, named this Roman settlement Carae; the suffix -iniana (thus Cariniana) was characteristic of many Roman manors.

The village Cariniana signified the hamlet and manor situated in the location of Carae and refers to its owner, Carinius. At the end of the second century, a tendency to concentrate the property led to the appearance of the large latifundia whose owners gave their names to places like this. Afterwards, in the Middle Ages, the name followed sound rules to become its current name.

King Alfonso XIII conferred the title of "city" to Cariñena owing to the quality of its wines.

Today, Cariñena is still producing wine, which is the main economical activity in the area. Cariñena's wines were well known for their oxidation and high alcohol content, but in the last ten years the wineries of the area have been improving techniques and yields, and today it is a promising Denomination of Origin in Spain. Tempranillo, Garnacha and Cariñena (red grapes) and Macabeo/Viura are the main varietals, but most of the wineries are also including grapes such as Merlot, Syrah, Chardonnay and others.

See also
Cariñena (DO)
Campo de Cariñena

References

External links

 Town hall site - Cariñena
 caiaragon.com - Ficha de la población 
 Aragon Guide - Cariñena Wine & Wineries

Municipalities in the Province of Zaragoza